Rhinoprenes pentanemus, the Threadfin scat, is a species of ephippid native to the Pacific Ocean  around Papua New Guinea and Australia.  This fish eats algae and also sewage. This species grows to a length of  TL.  This species is the only known member of its genus.

References

External links
 Photograph

Ephippidae
Monotypic fish genera
Fish described in 1964